Annaberg-Lungötz is a municipality in the district of Hallein, in the Austrian state of Salzburg.

Geography
The municipality lies in the Lammer River valley at the foot of the Gosaukamm.

History
It belonged for centuries to the Pongau. Only in 1896, when Hallein became a district capital, did the municipality become part of the Tennengau.

Tourism
One of its subdivisions, Annaberg im Lammertal is a village especially notable for tourism. Located in the Alps, it is part of the Dachstein West ski region. Summer activities available for tourists include mountain biking, paragliding, white water rafting, walking holidays etc.

References

External links
 Official website

Tennen Mountains
Dachstein Mountains
Cities and towns in Hallein District